Persatuan Sepakbola Batusangkar dan Sekitarnya is an Indonesian football club based in Batusangkar, Tanah Datar Regency, West Sumatra. They currently compete in the Liga 3.

References

Football clubs in Indonesia
Football clubs in West Sumatra
Association football clubs established in 1952
1952 establishments in Indonesia